Ivan Vasilevich Pershin (born 25 January 1980) is a Russian judoka.

He was born in Arkhangelsk.

At the 2008 Summer Olympics he was eliminated in the semifinals of the 90 kg competition after losing his fight to the upcoming gold medalist Irakli Tsirekidze. And he lost the following bronze medal fight to Sergei Aschwanden.

Achievements

External links
 
 

1980 births
Living people
Judoka at the 2008 Summer Olympics
Olympic judoka of Russia
Sportspeople from Arkhangelsk
Russian male judoka
21st-century Russian people